Cnaphalocrocis euryterminalis is a moth in the family Crambidae. It was described by George Hampson in 1917. It is found in India (Assam), Taiwan and Japan (Kyushu, Yakushima, the Tokara Islands, Amami Ōshima).

The wings are pale yellowish brown. The forewings with many minute black dots on the basal three-fourths of the costa. The antemedial line is dark brown and there is a broad dark brown marginal band, as well as a short fuscous discocellular lunule and a patch of white fine hairs. The hindwings have a dark postmedial line and a broad dark brown marginal band.

References

Moths described in 1917
Spilomelinae